A Chinese Torture Chamber Story is a 1994 Hong Kong erotic (Category III) black comedy film produced by Wong Jing and directed by Bosco Lam.

Plot

Siu-bak-choi (lit. "Little Cabbage") is a female servant of the physician Yeung Nai-mou. Yeung is open towards the topic of sex, which is usually considered taboo in traditional Chinese society. He invents a type of condom to help people avoid contracting sexually transmitted diseases, but his idea was not accepted and he was scorned at. Lau Hoi-sing, the lecherous son of a local judge, has an adulterous affair with Yeung's wife, but they are discovered by Little Cabbage. Yeung's wife tries to send Little Cabbage away by forcing the latter to marry Gok Siu-dai so as to prevent Little Cabbage from telling Yeung about her secret affair. Lau has been eyeing Little Cabbage for some time and he rapes her, but is discovered by Gok. Yeung's wife is afraid of being implicated so she instigates Lau to murder Gok and frame Yeung and Little Cabbage for the deed. The pair are put on trial and subjected to tortures to force them to "confess" to the crime.

Cast
 Yvonne Yung as Siu-bak-choi (Little Cabbage)
 Lawrence Ng as Yeung Nai-mou
 Tommy Wong as Gok Siu-dai
 Ching Mai as Jane,  Yeung's wife
 Oh Yin-hei as Yeung's sister
 Kenny Wong as Lau Hoi-sing
 Elvis Tsui as Win Chung-lung
 Kingdom Yuen as Nanny
 Julie Lee as Ki Dan-fung
 Lo Hung as Judge Lau, Hoi Sing's father
 Lee Siu-kei as Judge of Supreme Court
 Liu Fan as Prison guard
 Dave Lam as Court assistant
 Leung Sai-on
 Leung Kei-hei
 Aman Chang

External links
 
 

1994 films
1990s Cantonese-language films
Films set in 19th-century Qing dynasty
Hong Kong sex comedy films
Discotek Media
Films about rape
1990s sex comedy films
1994 comedy films
1990s Hong Kong films